Kirsten Jane Reilly (born 20 August 1995) is a Scottish footballer who plays as a midfielder for Crystal Palace in the FA Women's Championship.

Early life and education
Born in Edinburgh to Kathryn and John Reilly, Kirsten was raised with her sibling Neil in Musselburgh where she attended Musselburgh Grammar School. As a youth, she played for Musselburgh Windsor and Heart of Midlothian.

Playing career

University of West Alabama Tigers, 2013–16
Reilly attended the University of West Alabama where she played for the UWA Tigers from 2013–16. As a freshman, she was named to the Gulf South Conference All-Tournament Team, scored one goal and provided three assists. During her sophomore season, she scored three goals, including two game-winners, and recorded two assists. As a junior, Reilly scored nine goals during the 2015 season, including seven game winners that ranked second in the Gulf South Conference (GSC). Twice named GGSC Player of the Week, Reilly provided six assists on goals scored by other players.

Hibernian, 2018–19
Reilly signed with Hibernian ahead of the 2018 Scottish Women's Premier League season. She helped Hibs finish second in the league and qualify for the 2019–20 UEFA Women's Champions League, also winning two SWPL Cups and the Scottish Women's Cup in 2018.

Bristol City, 2019 
On 13 September 2019, Reilly signed with Bristol City for the 2019–20 FA WSL season. She made her debut for the team the following week in a 3–0 League Cup win over London Bees and made her only FA WSL appearance coming on as an 89th minute substitute in a 3–3 draw with Reading.

Rangers, 2020–2022 
On 21 December 2019, Reilly announced her return to the SWPL, signing an 18-month contract with Rangers ahead of the 2020 season.

References

External links
 
 
 Bristol City player profile
 University of West Alabama player profile
 

1995 births
Living people
Scottish women's footballers
Hibernian W.F.C. players
Rangers W.F.C. players
Bristol City W.F.C. players
Scottish Women's Premier League players
Women's Super League players
Women's association football midfielders
West Alabama Tigers women's soccer players
Scottish expatriate sportspeople in the United States
Scottish expatriate women's footballers
Expatriate women's soccer players in the United States
People educated at Musselburgh Grammar School
Footballers from Edinburgh
Sportspeople from Musselburgh
Footballers from East Lothian